Dorcadion lineatocolle is a species of beetle in the family Cerambycidae. It was described by Kraatz in 1873. It is known from North Macedonia, Greece, Bulgaria, and Serbia.

References

lineatocolle
Beetles described in 1873